Bwari, or Kabwari, is a minor Bantu language of the Democratic Republic of the Congo.

References

Languages of the Democratic Republic of the Congo
Great Lakes Bantu languages